58 may refer to: 
 58 (number)
 one of the years 58 BC, AD 58, 1958, 2058
 58 (band), an American rock band
 58 (golf), a round of 58 in golf
 "Fifty Eight", a song by Karma to Burn from the album Arch Stanton, 2014